Yang Jin-sung (born June 27, 1988) is a South Korean actress. After making her acting debut in the 2010 film Wedding Dress, Yang played supporting roles in various television dramas, such as the male protagonist's dead ex-girlfriend in Secret Love (2013). She starred in her first leading turn (in dual roles) in the 2014 fantasy/romance series Bride of the Century.

Filmography

Television series

Film

References

External links

Living people
1988 births
South Korean television actresses
South Korean film actresses
Ewha Womans University alumni